Santa Maria del Ponte is a frazione of Tione degli Abruzzi, in the Province of L'Aquila in the Abruzzo, region of Italy.

Frazioni of the Province of L'Aquila
Tione degli Abruzzi